Caloplaca nashii is an orange crustose lichen found on calcareous rocks in northern Mexico, southern California, and Baja California. It is the most common of many members of the genus Caloplaca found on rocks in Joshua Tree National Park. It may sometimes be slightly endolithic (growing inside solid rock). It does not have elongated lobes like some other crustose lichens. It has no prothallus. It is in the Caloplaca fungus genus of the Teloschistaceae family.

See also
List of Caloplaca species

References

Lichen species
Teloschistales
Lichens described in 2001